June Givanni is a Guyanese-born London-based film curator. She has specialized in African-related movies since 1985, and has worked internationally as a film and television programme consultant and writer. She is also a member of the Africa Movie Academy Award jury.

Background
June Ingrid Givanni was born in Georgetown, Guyana, and grew up in the UK.

She was co-ordinator of the Greater London Council's Third Eye Film Festival in 1983, and during the 1980s was active in working for the creation of specialist distribution circuits for the work of black and Third World filmmakers. At the British Film Institute (BFI) she created and was responsible for managing the African Caribbean Unit, and she compiled the first comprehensive directory of black and Asian films in the UK, as well as starting with Gaylene Gould the BFI's Black Film Bulletin (1993–96). Givanni has worked with various international film festivals programming African and African diaspora films as a guest curator, including at the São Paulo Short Film Festival in Brazil, the Kerala International Film Festival in India, Images Caraibes in Martinique, Creteil Film Festival, in Paris. Givanni has served on film juries at African film festivals such as FESPACO (from 1985), Zanzibar Festival of the Dhow Countries, the All Africa Film Awards in South Africa, the JCCarthage and others.

Her publications include the edited volumes Remote Control: Dilemmas of Black Intervention in British Film and TV (1996) and Symbolic Narratives/African Cinema: Audiences, Theory and the Moving Image (2001).

She runs the June Givanni Pan African Cinema Archive (JGPACA) in London, a personal collection of films, ephemera, manuscripts, publications, audio, photography, posters documenting pan-African cinema, in residence at MayDay Rooms (as of 2017).

In 2018 she was awarded an honorary doctorate by SOAS, University of London.

Selected published works
 Black/Asian film & video list (BFI Education 1988)
 Remote Control: Dilemmas of Black Intervention in British Film and TV (BFI Publishing, 1996; 
 Symbolic Narratives/African Cinema: Audiences, Theory and the Moving Image (BFI, 2001;

References

External links
 Official website June Givanni Pan African Cinema Archive (JGPACA)
 

Film curators
Living people
Guyanese emigrants to the United Kingdom
People from Georgetown, Guyana
Year of birth missing (living people)
Black British cinema
British archivists